Diplodoma laichartingella is a moth belonging to the genus Diplodoma. The species was first described by Johann August Ephraim Goeze in 1783.

It is native to Europe.

The wingspan of the moth is 11-13 mm. The head is light yellowish ochreous. Forewings dark fuscous, with some scattered whitish-yellowish dots and strigulae; a subquadrate whitish-yellowish dorsal spot before middle. Hindwings dark grey. Larva dull whitish; head pale brown; plate of 2 darker brown; 3 and 4 laterally brownish-tinged: in a three-sided case, enclosed in an outer shorter case, covered with fragments of refuse, on dead insects, fungus, etc.

References

Psychidae